Beleza is a surname. Notable people with the surname include:

André Beleza (born 1985), Brazilian footballer
Leonor Beleza (born 1948), Portuguese politician
Teresa Pizarro Beleza (born 1951), Portuguese academic